The 1874 County Louth by-election was fought on 8 April 1874.  The byelection was fought due to the double Election, chose to sit for Dundalk of the incumbent Home Rule MP, Philip Callan.  It was won by the Home Rule candidate George Harley Kirk.

References

1874 elections in the United Kingdom
By-elections to the Parliament of the United Kingdom in County Louth constituencies
1874 elections in Ireland